Iorio is an Italian surname (original a given name derived from Giorgio), and may refer to:

Átila Iório (1921–2002), Brazilian actor
Matt Iorio, American rally driver
Maurizio Iorio (born 1959), Italian retired footballer
Mike Iorio (born 1964), American professional wrestler under the ring name Big Guido
Nicola Di Iorio, Canadian politician
Pam Iorio (born 1959), American mayor of Tampa, Florida, and author
Ricardo Iorio (born 1962), Argentine heavy metal musician
Vincent Iorio (born 2002), Canadian ice hockey player

See also
La figlia di Iorio
Jorio, another surname

Italian-language surnames